The Manskin Indians were a tribe of Indigenous Americans who  were a part of the Powhatan Confederacy in historic Virginia. From 1620–1750 they are referred to as "Manskin", on several maps, a name derived from Manaskunt. The numerous separate Indian villages shown in the Zuniga Map combined under the rule of Opechancanough, as a result of the pressures of losses from infectious disease and encroachment by the English colonists.  The Manskin lived in a two-mile stretch of the Pamunkey River near where today Rt. 360 crosses the Pamunkey River in King William County, Virginia.

The Manskin are shown in almost all of the early maps of Virginia.
Pedro de Zuniga labeled Totopotmoy Creek as Manaskint in 1608, but it was wrongly translated as Menaskunt, so no one made the naming connection. Zuniga shows two villages, Youghann (Youghtanund) and Manaskint (Manskin), just upstream and across from Cattytaco (Catachiptico).
Anthony Langstron referred to Totopotomov Creek as Manskin Creek in 1662 and shows Opechancanough as living in the Island Field on Pampatike Farm.  
Augustine Herman labels the Manskin as living on or near Guttin Isle (The Island Field) in 1670. 
John Lederer clearly draws the Island Field as a circle and puts the Manskin name just above it in 1671. 
Johannes van Keulen also draws the Manskin as living on "Guttin Isle" in 1680.
Robert Morden named the Pamunkey River as the Manskin River in 1701.
Hermon Moll labels the peninsula as "Manskin Indian Land" in 1732.

After 1750, the Manskin Indians disappeared as a tribe from the historical record. They show up in no lists of the tribes in inventories of the Powhatan Confederacy.

The Manskin name lives on in toponyms on maps today, whose origins were recognized only recently. The town of Manquin is located just north of The Island Field on Pampatike Farm, which is on Moncuin Creek.  Both are anglicized versions of Manskin.

Sources

 Files of the Virginia Historical Society (Richmond, VA)
 Frederick Webb Hodge, Handbook of American Indians North of Mexico, V. 2/4, Washington, DC: GPO. 1912, p. 931
 Virginia Department of Historic Resources, Notes on Virginia, Number 50
 New York Public Library Digital Library
 David Rumsey Historical Map Collection

External links 
 
Opechancanough Marker Dedication, page 75
Handbook of American Indians North of Mexico V. 2/4 By Frederick Webb Hodge – Manskin Indians erroneously located on Pamunky River

All these links show maps with the Manskin Indians located on the Pamunkey River.
Pedro de Zuniga Map 1608
Anthony Langstrom Map 1662
Augustine Herman Map 1670
John Lederer Map 1671
Johannes Van Keulen Map 1680
Robert Morden Map 1680
Robert Morden Map 1701
John Seller Map 1703
Herman Moll Map 1732
John Gibson (Engraver) Map 1754

Native American tribes in Virginia
Powhatan Confederacy